The Freedom and Constitution Day was a former public holiday in Turkey celebrated on 27 May between 1963 and 1981 in commemoration of the 27 May 1960 military coup and the new constitution.

By the 1960 military coup on 27 May, the 11th Parliament was abolished.  On 9 July 1961, a  referandum was held for a new  constitution, and on 15 October 1961 Turkey returned to democratic political system. On 4 April 1963, a public holiday was enacted to commemorate the new constitution.  The holiday was on the 27 May. The public holiday was abolished on 17 March 1981 following the 12 September 1980 military coup.

References

1963 establishments in Turkey
1981 disestablishments in Turkey
Turkey
May observances
Annual events in Turkey
Spring (season) events in Turkey
Former public holidays
Public holidays in Turkey